George Duckett may refer to:

 George Duckett (Calne MP) (1684–1732), British MP for Calne
 Sir George Duckett, 1st Baronet (1725–1822), born George Jackson, British MP for Weymouth & Melcombe Regis, Colchester
 Sir George Duckett, 2nd Baronet (1777–1856), British landowner and politician, son of the above
 Sir George Floyd Duckett (1811–1902), English soldier and antiquarian, son of the above
 George Duckett (police officer), Commissioner of Police of Bermuda, who was murdered

See also
 Duckett (surname)